Liyuchi is a metro station of Line 9 and Line 10 of Chongqing Rail Transit in Jiangbei District of Chongqing Municipality, China.

It serves the area surrounding East Jianxin Road.

The station opened with Line 10 and its 2 platforms on 28 December 2017 and was expanded on 25 January 2022 with Line 9 in addition to 2 more platforms.

Station Structure

Line 9 Platform
Platform Layout
An island platform is in use for Line 9 trains travelling in both directions. This section of the station is located on the east of the Line 10 platform.

Line 10 Platform
Platform Layout
An island platform is used for Line 10 trains travelling in both directions. As stations beyond here toward Lanhualu are part of Phase II of the metro line, which is still under construction, all South-bound Line 10 trains terminate here. The station will act as a reversing station using its single transition line for trains to switch direction until Phase 2 is completed. Before November 2022, only one side of the platform was in use as the terminus for south-bound trains.Since November 2022, to cooperate with the debugging of Phase 2, the reserved platform has been put into use for trains towards Wangjiazhuang. However, at the beginning of the debugging, some trains still terminate here. But when the period is over, no trains will terminate here.

Status at the beginning of the debugging

Future

Exits
There are a total of 8 entrances/exits for the plan of station, still 4 exits reserved for its future construction.

Surroundings
Nearby places
East Jianxin Road
Nearby Stations
Hongtudi station (a Line 6 & Line 10 Station)

See also
Chongqing Rail Transit (CRT)
Line 9 (CRT)
Line 10 (CRT)

References

Railway stations in Chongqing
Railway stations in China opened in 2017
Chongqing Rail Transit stations